Oregon High School may refer to:

Oregon High School (Oregon, Illinois), Oregon, Illinois
Oregon High School (Wisconsin), Oregon, Wisconsin